The 2018–19 Ohio State Buckeyes men's basketball team represented Ohio State University in the 2018–19 NCAA Division I men's basketball season. Their head coach was Chris Holtmann, in his second season with the Buckeyes. The Buckeyes played their home games at Value City Arena in Columbus, Ohio as members of the Big Ten Conference. The Buckeyes finished the season 20–15, 8–12 in Big Ten play to finish in a tie for eighth place. As the No. 8 seed in the Big Ten tournament, they defeated Indiana in the second round before losing to Michigan State in the quarterfinals. They received an at-large bid to the NCAA tournament as the No. 11 seed in the Midwest region. There they upset Iowa State in the First Round before losing to Houston in the Second Round.

Previous season
The Buckeyes finished the 2017–18 season 25–9, 15–3 in Big Ten play to finish in a tie for second place. As the No. 2 seed in the Big Ten tournament, they lost to Penn State in the quarterfinals. They received an at-large bid to the NCAA tournament as the No. 5 seed in the West region. They defeated South Dakota State in the First Round before losing to Gonzaga in the Second Round.

Offseason

Departures

Incoming transfers

2018 recruiting class

2019 Recruiting class

Roster

Schedule and results

|-
!colspan=9 style=| Exhibition

|-
!colspan=9 style=| Regular season

|-
!colspan=9 style=|Big Ten tournament

|-
!colspan=9 style=|<span style=>NCAA tournament

Rankings

^Coaches Poll did not release a Week 2 poll at the same time AP did.

*AP does not release post-NCAA Tournament rankings

See also
2018–19 Ohio State Buckeyes women's basketball team

References

Ohio State Buckeyes men's basketball seasons
Ohio State
Ohio State Buckeyes
Ohio State Buckeyes
Ohio State